Deogad Dam, is an earthfill dam on Karli Nalla river near Phonda, Sindhudurg district in state of Maharashtra in India.

Specifications

Purpose
 Irrigation  Hydroelectricity

See also
 Dams in Maharashtra
 List of reservoirs and dams in India

References

Dams in Sindhudurg district
Dams completed in 2005
2005 establishments in Maharashtra